The 1978–79 season was Stoke City's 72nd season in the Football League and the 25th in the Second Division.

Alan Durban continued his good start at Stoke and they were involved in a promotion race from the start of the campaign. It proved to be a very exciting season with four clubs all keeping pace with each other meaning that it went down until the final match of the season. Stoke needed to beat Notts County at Meadow Lane to gain promotion and despite a large Stoke away following it seemed that County would spoil the party but with just two minutes remaining Paul Richardson scored the winning goal and Stoke took the final promotion position in the most dramatic way.

Season review

League
With all close season in which to work out the future, Alan Durban turned to his old club Shrewsbury Town and paid £60,000 for midfielder Sammy Irvine and paid £50,000 for Manchester City's experienced defender Mike Doyle. The 1978–79 season started well with Stoke winning five of their first six matches. Paul Randall arrived from Bristol Rovers as Stoke maintained their good form. They were rarely out of the top three but neither were promotion rivals Brighton & Hove Albion, Crystal Palace and Sunderland. This meant that the race for promotion went all the way to the final day of the season and Stoke knew that they had to win their last League match away at Notts County to gain a return to the First Division. Backed by well over 14,000 fans, Stoke came out victorious albeit late on, Paul Richardson's header two minutes from time deciding the match and earned Stoke 3rd spot in the table, finishing a point above Sunderland.

FA Cup
Stoke suffered misfortune in this season's FA Cup when, having taken a 2–0 lead in their third round tie at home to Oldham Athletic, a heavy blizzard caused the match to be abandoned. In the rematch Oldham claimed a 1–0 victory.

League Cup
Stoke had a useful run beating Sunderland, Northampton Town and Charlton Athletic all away before losing 3–1 to Watford at the quarter final stage.

Final league table

Results

Stoke's score comes first

Legend

Football League Second Division

FA Cup

League Cup

Friendlies

Squad statistics

References

External links

Stoke City F.C. seasons
Stoke City